Untermensch (plural: Untermenschen) is a Nazi term for non-Aryan people they deem as inferior, who were often referred to as "the masses from the East", that is Jews, Roma, and Slavs (mainly ethnic Poles, Serbs, and later also Russians). The term was also applied to mixed race and black people. Jewish, Polish and Romani people, along with the physically and mentally disabled, as well as homosexuals and political dissidents, and on rare instances, POWs from Western Allied armies, were to be exterminated in the Holocaust. According to the Generalplan Ost, the Slavic population of East-Central Europe was to be reduced in part through mass murder in the Holocaust, with a majority expelled to Asia and used as slave labor in the Reich. These concepts were an important part of the Nazi racial policy.

Etymology   
It is widely believed that the term "under man" was coined by the Nazis, but this belief is incorrect because the term "under man" was first used by the American author and Ku Klux Klan member Lothrop Stoddard in the title of his 1922 book The Revolt Against Civilization: The Menace of the Under-man. Stoddard applies the term to those who he considers unable to function in civilization, which he generally (but not entirely) attributes to race. The Nazis later adopted it from the title of the book's German edition Der Kulturumsturz: Die Drohung des Untermenschen (1925).

The German word Untermensch had been used in earlier periods, but it had not been used in a racial sense, for example, it was used in the 1899 novel Der Stechlin by Theodor Fontane. Since most writers who employed the term did not address the question of when and how the word entered the German language, into English, Untermensch is usually translated as "subhuman". The leading Nazi who attributed the concept of the East-European "under man" to Stoddard was Alfred Rosenberg who, referring to Russian communists, wrote in his Der Mythus des zwanzigsten Jahrhunderts (1930) that "this is the kind of human being that Lothrop Stoddard has called the 'under man.'" ["...den Lothrop Stoddard als 'Untermenschen' bezeichnete."] Quoting Stoddard: "The Under-Man – the man who measures under the standards of capacity and adaptability which is imposed by the social order in which he lives".

It is possible that Stoddard constructed his "under man" as an opposite of Friedrich Nietzsche's Übermensch (superman) concept. Stoddard does not explicitly say this, but he critically refers to the "superman" idea at the end of his book (p. 262). Wordplays with Nietzsche's term seem to have been used repeatedly as early as the 19th century and, due to the German linguistic trait of being able to combine prefixes and roots almost at will in order to create new words, this development can be considered logical. For instance, German author Theodor Fontane contrasts the Übermensch/Untermensch word pair in chapter 33 of his novel Der Stechlin. Nietzsche used Untermensch at least once in contrast to Übermensch in Die fröhliche Wissenschaft (1882). Earlier examples of Untermensch include Romanticist Jean Paul using the term in his novel Hesperus (1795) in reference to an Orangutan (Chapter "8. Hundposttag").

Nazi propaganda and policy 

In a speech which he delivered to the Bavarian regional parliament in 1927, the Nazi propagandist Julius Streicher, publisher of Der Stürmer, used the term Untermensch referring to the communists of the German Bavarian Soviet Republic:

The Nazis repeatedly used the term Untermensch in writings and speeches which they directed against the Jews, the most notorious example of them was a 1942 SS publication with the title Der Untermensch, which contains an anti-semitic tirade sometimes considered to be an extract from a speech by Heinrich Himmler. In the pamphlet "The SS as an Anti-Bolshevist Fighting Organization", published in 1936, Himmler wrote:

In his speech "Weltgefahr des Bolschewismus" ("World danger of Bolshevism") in 1936, Joseph Goebbels said that "subhumans exist in every people as a leavening agent". At the 1935 Nazi party congress rally at Nuremberg, Goebbels also declared that "Bolshevism is the declaration of war by Jewish-led international subhumans against culture itself."

Another example of the use of the term Untermensch, this time in connection with anti-Soviet propaganda, is a brochure entitled "Der Untermensch", edited by Himmler and distributed by the Race and Settlement Head Office. SS-Obersturmführer Ludwig Pröscholdt, Jupp Daehler and SS-Hauptamt-Schulungsamt Koenig are associated with its production. Published in 1942 after the start of Operation Barbarossa, the German invasion of the Soviet Union, it is around 50 pages long and consists for the most part of photos portraying the enemy in an extremely negative way (see link below for the title page). 3,860,995 copies were printed in the German language. It was translated into Greek, French, Dutch, Danish, Bulgarian, Hungarian, Czech and seven other languages. The pamphlet says the following:

Sub-human types
The Nazis divided the people who they considered the sub-humans into different types; they placed priority on the extermination of the Jews, and the exploitation of others as slaves.

Historian Robert Jan van Pelt writes that for the Nazis, "it was only a small step to a rhetoric pitting the European Mensch against the Soviet Untermensch, which had come to mean a Russian in the clutches of Judeo-Bolshevism."

The Untermensch concept included Jews, Roma and Sinti (Gypsies), and Slavic peoples such as Poles, Serbs and Russians. Slavs were regarded as Untermenschen, barely fit for exploitation as slaves. Hitler and Goebbels compared them to the "rabbit family" or to "stolid animals" that were "idle" and "disorganized" and spread like a "wave of filth". However, some among the Slavs who happened to have Nordic racial features were deemed to have distant Germanic descent which meant partially "Aryan" origin, and if under 10 years old, they were to be Germanized (see: kidnapping of children by Nazi Germany).

The Nazis were utterly contemptuous of the Slavs, as even prior to World War II, Slavs – particularly the Poles – were deemed to be inferior to Germans and other Aryans. After Adolf Hitler gained political power in Germany, the concept of non-Aryan "sub-human slave-material" was developed and started to be used also towards other Slavic peoples. Poles and Serbs were at the bottom of the Slavic "racial hierarchy" established by the Nazis. Soon after the Molotov–Ribbentrop Pact expired, Russians also started to be seen as "subhumans".  Similarly, Belarusians, Czechs, Slovaks, and Ukrainians were considered to be inferior. Nonetheless, there were Slavs such as Bosniaks, Bulgarians, and Croats who collaborated with Nazi Germany that were still being perceived as not racially "pure" enough to reach the status of Germanic peoples, yet they were eventually considered ethnically better than other Slavs, mostly due to  theories about these nations having a minimal amount of Slavic genes and considerable admixtures of Germanic and Turkic blood.

In order to forge a strategic alliance with the Independent State of Croatia – a puppet state created after the invasion of Yugoslavia and the Kingdom of Bulgaria, the Nazis deviated from a strict interpretation of their racial ideology, and Croats were officially described as "more Germanic than Slav", a notion supported by Croatia's fascist (Ustashe) dictator Ante Pavelić who maintained that the "Croats were descendants of the ancient Goths" and "had the Panslav idea forced upon them as something artificial". Hitler also deemed the Bulgarians to be "Turkoman" in origin.

While the Nazis were inconsistent in the implementation of their policy – for instance, mostly implementing the Final Solution while also implementing Generalplan Ost – the democidal death toll was in the range of tens of millions of victims. It is related to the concept of "life unworthy of life", a more specific term which originally referred to the severely disabled who were involuntarily euthanised in Aktion T4, and was eventually applied to the extermination of the Jews. That policy of euthanasia started officially on 1 September 1939 when Hitler signed an edict to the effect, and carbon monoxide was first used to murder disabled patients. The same gas was used in the death camps such as Treblinka, although they used engine exhaust gases to achieve the same end. In directive No. 1306 by Reich Ministry of Public Enlightenment and Propaganda from 24 October 1939, the term "Untermensch" is used in reference to Polish ethnicity and culture, as follows:

Biology classes in Nazi Germany schools taught about differences between the race of Nordic German "Übermenschen" and "ignoble" Jewish and Slavic "subhumans". The view that Slavs were subhuman was widespread among the German masses, and chiefly applied to the Poles. It continued to find support after the war.

During the war, Nazi propaganda instructed Wehrmacht officers to tell their soldiers to target people who it considered "Jewish Bolshevik subhumans" and it also stated that the war in the Soviet Union was being waged between the Germans and the Jewish, Gypsies and Slavic Untermenschen.

During the Warsaw Uprising, Himmler ordered the destruction of the Warsaw ghetto because according to him it allowed the "living space" of 500,000 subhumans.

As a pragmatic way to solve military manpower shortages, the Nazis used soldiers from some Slavic countries, firstly from the Reich's allies Croatia and Slovakia as well as within occupied territories. The concept of the Slavs in particular being Untermenschen served the Nazis' political goals; it was used to justify their expansionist policy and especially their aggression against Poland and the Soviet Union in order to achieve Lebensraum, particularly in Ukraine. Early plans of the German Reich (summarized as Generalplan Ost) envisioned the ethnic cleansing and elimination of no fewer than 50 million people, who were not considered fit for Germanization, from territories it wanted to conquer in Europe; Ukraine's chernozem ("black earth") soil was considered a particularly desirable zone for colonization by the Herrenvolk.

See also 

 Afrophobia
 Antisemitism
 Anti-Slavic sentiment
 Antiziganism
 Aryan certificate
 Caste
 Class discrimination
 Enemy of the people
 Extremism
 The Holocaust
 Incitement to genocide
 Mischling
 Nazi eugenics
 Nazi racial theories
 Nuremberg Laws
 Rassenschande
 Racial hierarchy
 Racial hygiene
 Racial policy of Nazi Germany
 Racism
 Übermensch
 White nationalism
 White supremacy

References 
Notes

Further reading

External links 

 Der Untermensch  propaganda poster published by the SS.
 
 "Die Drohung des Untermenschen" This is an example of the term "Untermensch" being used in the context of the Nazi eugenics programme. The table suggests that "inferior" people (unmarried and married criminals, parents whose children have learning disabilities) have more children than "superior" people (ordinary Germans, academics). Note that the heading is the subtitle of the German version of Lothrop Stoddard's book.
 Der Untermensch: the Nazi pamphlet

1920s neologisms
American English words
Anti-black racism in Germany
Anti-Polish sentiment
Antiziganism
Anti-Russian sentiment
Anti-Serbian sentiment
Anti-Slavic sentiment
Anti-LGBT sentiment
Axis powers
German words and phrases
Historical definitions of race
Holocaust terminology
Nazi eugenics
Ethnic and religious slurs
Antisemitism